Clarabelle Cow is a fictional character created in 1927 at Walt Disney Pictures. As an anthropomorphic cow, Clarabelle is one of Minnie Mouse's best friends. She is usually depicted as the girlfriend of Horace Horsecollar, although she has also been paired with Goofy.

Appearances

Animation
Clarabelle first appeared as a Bethany Waugh prototype cow in the cartoon Trolley Troubles in 1927.  She appeared frequently in cartoons from 1930 to 1932 and less frequently afterwards, taking her final classic-era bow in 1942. As with most Disney characters, she was later given small cameos in the featurettes Mickey's Christmas Carol (1983) and The Prince and the Pauper (1990) and the 1988 feature film Who Framed Roger Rabbit.

Clarabelle mostly played bit-parts in the 30+ films in which she appeared and her character was never as fully developed as Mickey, Minnie, Goofy, Donald Duck or Pluto. She and Horace Horsecollar changed from normal farmyard animals into anthropomorphized beings as necessary.

In modern animation, Clarabelle has returned to active use, appearing first in a few segments of Mickey Mouse Works and in a brief scene in Mickey's Once Upon a Christmas. In Disney's House of Mouse she regularly turned up as a gossip columnist with the tagline "Gossip is Always True".

Clarabelle has also made appearances in the preschool series Mickey Mouse Clubhouse and is featured as Goofy's girlfriend (in which she owns a puppy named Bella) and in the direct-to-video movie Mickey, Donald, Goofy: The Three Musketeers as Pete's lieutenant and Goofy's love interest. She also appears in Mickey and the Roadster Racers, where she displays attraction towards both Goofy and Horace.

Filmography
1927 - Trolley Troubles (cameo)
1928 - Hungry Hobos (cameo)
1928 - Steamboat Willie
1929 - Plane Crazy
1929 - The Plowboy
1929 - Mickey's Choo-Choo
1929 - The Karnival Kid
1930 - The Barnyard Concert
1930 - The Shindig
1930 - The Chain Gang
1930 - Pioneer Days
1931 - The Birthday Party
1931 - Mother Goose Melodies
1931 - Blue Rhythm
1931 - The Barnyard Broadcast
1931 - The Beach Party
1932 - The Mad Dog
1932 - Barnyard Olympics
1932 - Mickey's Revue
1932 - Mickey's Nightmare
1932 - The Whoopee Party
1932 - Touchdown Mickey
1932 - Parade of the Award Nominees
1933 - Mickey's Mellerdrammer
1933 - Ye Olden Days
1933 - Mickey's Gala Premiere
1934 - Camping Out
1934 - Orphan's Benefit
1935 - The Band Concert
1935 - On Ice
1935 - Mickey's Fire Brigade
1936 - Mickey's Grand Opera
1936 - Mickey's Polo Team
1937 - Mickey's Amateurs
1941 - Orphan's Benefit (remake)
1942 - Mickey's Birthday Party
1942 - Symphony Hour
1983 - Mickey's Christmas Carol
1988 - Who Framed Roger Rabbit (cameo)
1990 - Roller Coaster Rabbit (cameo)
1990 - The Prince and the Pauper
1993 - Bonkers (Stork Exchange/Rubber Room Song (Casabonkers))
1999 - Mickey Mouse Works
2001 - Disney's House of Mouse
2004 - Mickey, Donald, Goofy: The Three Musketeers
2006 - Mickey Mouse Clubhouse
2011 - Minnie's Bow-Toons
2013 - Get a Horse!
2014 - Mickey Mouse
2017 - Mickey Mouse Mixed-Up Adventures
2018 - Ralph Breaks the Internet (cameo)
2021 - Mickey Mouse Funhouse

Comics
When the Disney characters started to feature in comic strips and comic books, Clarabelle Cow was one of the first. Her first appearance was in the Mickey Mouse comic strip for April 2, 1930. Along with Horace Horsecollar, Clara Cluck, Goofy, Minnie, and Mickey, she appeared in comics on a regular basis in the fifties, sixties and seventies.

For a brief time, during the late 1960s, Clarabelle began dating Goofy, perhaps in an attempt to give Goofy a girlfriend. During this time Horace's whereabouts are unknown.  Clarabelle's status with Goofy was challenged by a rival named Glory-Bee. In later comics, Clarabelle and Horace were a couple again. Clarabelle also has a young cousin, Bertie the Jinx, a niece, Itsy-Betsy, and a socialite aunt named Miss Bovina, who have appeared in several issues of Walt Disney's Comics and Stories.

From the eighties forward only a few stories with Clarabelle Cow were made in the United States. In Europe, especially in Italy, the production of stories continued to the present day. In Italian comics Clarabelle (called Clarabella) is very popular and she is the girlfriend of Horace Horsecollar (Orazio Cavezza).

Disney theme parks
From September 2006 to September 2008, Clarabelle Cow and Horace Horsecollar appeared together for meet-and-greets in Town Square at the Magic Kingdom in Walt Disney World.  Also, they were in the Main Street Family Fun Day Parade.  Clarabelle appears seasonally in "Mickey's Boo-to-You Halloween Parade", "Mickey's Once Upon a Christmastime Parade", and the "Mickey's Most Merriest Celebration" castle show. She and Horace both appear in the Hoedown Happening in Frontierland and as featured characters in the "Move It! Shake It! Mousekedance It!" street party, with Clarabelle in particular atop her own party box and with her own dialogue.

Clarabelle also appears (without Horace) at Disneyland Park. She has also appeared in several Disneyland parades and shows over the years, including The World According to Goofy, Light Magic, the Parade of the Stars, Fantasmic, A Christmas Fantasy Parade and Celebrate! A Street Party. Clarabelle and Horace come out for meet-and-greets and appear in parades and shows on a regular basis at Tokyo Disneyland as well. In 2009, Clarabelle played a leading character in the New Year's Greeting at Tokyo Disneyland and Tokyo DisneySea.

Clarabelle Cow was chosen to meet and greet for Character Fan Days at Disneyland. She is accompanied by Horace Horsecollar which is his first meet and greet at Disneyland in Anaheim.

At Disney California Adventure at the Disneyland Resort, in the Buena Vista Street area there is an ice cream shop named Clarabelle's Hand-Scooped Ice Cream.

She also features with Horace in Mickey's Halloween Celebration and Goofy's Garden Party in Disneyland Paris. In Christmas 2016, Clarabelle returned to Magic Kingdom for Mickey's Most Merriest Celebration.

Video games
Clarabelle appeared as the DJ of the song "Miwaku No Tango" in the 2000 Japanese Nintendo 64 game Dance Dance Revolution Disney Dancing Museum.

Clarabelle appears in Disney's Toontown Online. She plays the role of giving the player furniture to decorate their estates, with the catalog players must order from is a "Cattlelog". Her appearance is also somewhat changed to look like an operator.

She also makes a minor appearance in Kingdom Hearts II in the Timeless River World using her old black and white design. She appears with the same design in Kingdom Hearts III in the minigame "The Karnival Kid".

Clarabelle is also seen in the Epic Mickey video games, as one of the forgotten characters that Mickey sees during his journey. She lives in OsTown, one of the games environs, and is known to be romantically involved with Horace Horsecollar.

References

External links
 
 
Clarabelle's Profile @ HooZoo
Whither Clarabelle Cow?: 11 Semi-Forgotten Disney Characters
WeirdSpace Encyclopedia: Clarabelle Cow 
 Clarabelle Cow on IMDb
The Encyclopedia of Disney Animated Shorts: Clarabelle Cow

Disney core universe characters
Fictional cattle
Disney comics characters
Fictional characters from Calisota
Film characters introduced in 1927
Comics characters introduced in 1930
Fictional anthropomorphic characters
Female characters in animation
Female characters in comics
Animated characters introduced in 1927